Paddar, also spelled Padar, is a Sub-District and remote valley in the Kishtwar district of the union territory of Jammu and Kashmir, India. It falls in the Jammu division. It consists of two tehsils namely Machail and Atholi Paddar  The valley covers the entire southeastern portion of the Kishtwar district. It borders Zanskar (Ladakh) in the north and east, Pangi (Himachal Pradesh) in the south and the rest of Jammu and Kashmir in the west. The valley is known for its sapphire mines. It lies along the Chandrabhaga river (Chenab) in the Great Himalayas. Paddar is among the most remote regions of Jammu and Kashmir. There are various sub valleys within Paddar, such as Machail, Gandhari, Kabban, Ongai, Bhuzunu, Barnaj, Bhuzas, Kijai Nallah, and Dharlang, among others.

History
Little concrete material is currently available about the early history of civilization in Paddar. However, it is said that there were no humans in Paddar until the 8th century. Eventually, people living in nearby areas such as Bhaderwah, Lahaul, and Ladakh were attracted to the ample grazing lands in the valley. At first, the valley was used to graze cattle, but eventually people settled there permanently. The area was inhabited mostly by the Thakur community.

Paddar was under Guge rule from the 10th to 14th centuries. After the 14th century, Guge rule in the area collapse and civilization in Paddar divided into smaller areas. These areas were ruled by Rajput Ranas. Each Rana usually controlled one to three villages, often fighting with other Ranas for control of land. In middle of 17th Century the name of one strong man Rana Sheetal Singh emerged in the Padder History. He was a Rana of his Rajwara comprising few villages with his headquarters at Leondi Village. Later, the Raja of Chamba crossed the Sansari Jhullah with his soldiers and had a sudden attack on forces of Rana Sheetal Singh. The Valley fell into the hands of Chamba rulers. After Chatur Singh's reign the Rajas of Chamba exercised their sovereignty over Padder for six generations. The area enjoyed peace and prosperity thereafter. In the spring of 1836 A.D. Zorawar Singh Marched across the Valley. Chamba  forces under Rattan Singh were defeated. The territory of Padder was thus annexed to Kishtwar.

Residents of ancient Paddar were primarily serpent worshipers. However, they observed other Hindu rites and rituals as well. Besides Hindus, Muslims and Buddhists also settled in the valley. The Buddhists were spread in the upper reaches of the Machail, Kaban, and Gandhari valleys and in the town of Gulabgarh. The first Muslims came to Paddar during the period of the Raja Shantar Kantar from Chamba. The descendants of those Muslims still live in Atholi and Kijai. There were long military conflicts in Paddar starting in the middle of the 17th century.

Culture
Padder has an extensive cultural history. Residents of ancient Paddar were primarily serpent worshipers. Hindus use Dhoons (a traditional dhol or drum) and flutes in Temples to play various ragas of different devtas. Kharzath is a famous dance form of this region, performed in temples and on special occasions. Temples of different Nagdevtas or Serpent Gods are still visible and are adorned with wood carvings of snakes of all kinds. The majority of the population is Pahari Hindu. The culture is very similar to that of Pangi, Himachal Pradesh and Bhaderwah. There are numerous folk songs and lores from the region known as sugli. Kharzath is the region's most well-known dance form. Chadar (Pattu) and Joji for women,  Kamri(Chola), Sutad(lower)and Toot
(traditional Padderi topi) for men completes the traditional Padderi dress.

Demographics 

Religion

Hinduism is the largest religion in Paddar and is followed by around 83.63% of the population. Other significant religions are Buddhism (9.46%) and Islam (6.84%).

Language 
The majority of the population (nearly 80%) speaks Padri as a first language. Pangwali (in Gandhari) and Kishtwari(in Sazar) are also spoken the valley. The Hindus in the valley speak the languages listed above. The Buddhist community speaks Bhoti, while the Muslim population of the valley primarily speaks Kashmiri.

Villages
Karthai is the among the most accessible villages in Paddar. The village lies in green paddy fields, with the river Chenab on one side and dense forest on the other. It is 58 km from the district capital and is a cultural centre.
Gulabgarh is the sub-divisional headquarter and commercial center of Paddar and a hub for the area's economic activities. It has a sizeable market area and a TRC (Tourist Reception Area). Transport services run from here to Kishtwar town and Pangi. It also hosts local cricket tournaments. Besides for its economy and recreational opportunities, Gulabgarh also hosts many government offices, J&K Bank, a police station and rest houses.
Atholi is the administrative capital. It contains many sub-district level offices including the Atholi Tehsildar's office, Munsiff Camp Atholi, the Paddar Forest Range Office, the Paddar ZEO office, the Atholi Tehsil Library, the Atholi fire station and post office, and the Paddar sub-district hospital. It is also known for a scenic spot called Pathaal and a water mill (known locally as Ghiraat) run by a waterfall in the village., AEE office Jal Shakti Vibhaag, Higher Secondary School, Girl's High School and Degree college are other significant establishments in the town.
Tatta Pani is known for its natural Hot spring.There is a waterfall 'Hanswar Fall'.Sheshnag temple is also situated here.It also said that the of(kund) Hot Spring gives relief to joints pain.
Sohal is used by off-roaders and as a base camp when travelling to Chitto, Kannan and Ongayee villages. 
The Kabban village is located along the Sohal/Kabban Nala. Then Ungaie Village along the Ungaie Nala. The Chenab river runs through the villages of Tiyari, Chiito, and Ishtyari.
Gandhari is visited by mountaineers, hikers, and climbers, and is known for green pastures. Its first village, Bhatwas, is about 30 km from Gulabgarh, with 25 km accessible with motor vehicles. The rest can only be travelled by foot. The trek route from here continues to Machail in Paddar, Zanskar in Ladakh, and Pangi. As per Sanskrit language, Gandhari means "girl from Gandhara", and is a prominent character in the Mahabharata, an Indian epic. Gandhari was a princess in Gandhara and the wife of Dhritrashtra, the blind king of Hastinapura. She was the mother of a hundred sons, the Kauravas. Maa Chandi's holy shrine, Shiva temple, Nag temple, and Buddhist Gompa Monastery are also located in the village. It is a popular spot for picnicking, touring, and adventuring, and is located approximately 9000 feet above sea level. Gandhari valley comprises six villages, three of which are Hindu and three of which are Buddhist. At lower Chugg, Kaandang is a lush green field. Cricket matches are frequently played here. The valley's most beautiful spots are Sanyoth, Nagni, and Chandi Padhar. Chandi Mata is said to have appeared in the Chandi Pandhar meadow. The journey to Zanskar begins after this. Agriculture is the main source of income in this region. Here, potatoes, wheat, peas, and other traditional crops are grown. After crossing Sansari Nallah the state of Jammu and Kashmir comes to an end.Haloti and Hangoo are the nearest revenue villages to the Machail Mata shrine. The majority of the residents in these two villages are Buddhists. This villages are known for yaks, which are found only in this area after Ladakh. These domesticated yaks are raised to provide milk and to plough fields for agriculture. Many Buddhist monasteries are also found here.Machail is known for the Chandi Mata Temple and the annual Machail Yatra festival, during which lakhs of pilgrims visit the temple. Machail has recently been granted the status of tehsil.Lossani is the second closest revenue village to Machail's Chandi Mata Mandir. The majority of the settlements here are part of the Buddhist community. They are known for yaks and horses, which are used for the same purposes as in Haloti and Hangoo. Lossani is the second largest village in Paddar.

Festivals
Some notable festivals celebrated in Paddar are :
sazzar.caulter of Aatakh rakshabandhan mela sherzaath to all India  caulter of sazzar and paddarMela Magh is an annual celebration lasting three days in the village of Ligri. Thousands of people from villages in the surrounding area take part. The disciples (chelas) of gods and goddesses, wearing local woollen (pattu) dresses and locally made grass shoes, perform specific religious dances. The third day of the celebration is marked by a visit to the holy lack in the upper reaches of Munhal Dhaar.Zaagra is a celebration where a huge fire is lit in front of a temple of god/goddess during the night and the chelas (disciples), along with the other locals, dance around the fire to the music of dhols and flutes.Losar is the Tibetan New Year, which is celebrated mostly by the Buddhist communities. Households observe Losar together. People drink the local brew Chhaang and celebrate for weeks. Losar generally occurs in the months of January and February.Naghoi Mela is celebrated in Gandhari in the middle of August every year. People across Paddar and Pangi (Himachal Pradesh) come here to celebrate the festival at the Chandi Mata Mandir Gandhari. It is a festival of two Days. The rath of Devtas from Muthal and Bhatwas join at Chandi Mata Temple at Chagh and celebrate the festival.This festival is celebrated for three days. It is also celebrated in villages of Pallali and Machail. Cheti is celebrated in Gandhari, Pallali and Machail amidst heavy snowfall. It is celebrated with great pomp in Gandhari. People take greetings to each other's homes. This festival is an opportunity for the people who are locked in the snow to meet each other to celebrate the winters. Mithyaag is celebrated to mark the onset of spring and to pray to Mother Earth for better crop yields. People gather at a holy sites and dance around the sacred weapons of the gods.Yatra is a shrine dedicated to the goddess Durga, popularly known as Machail Mata. is located in the village of Machel, in the Kishtwar district of the Jammu region. It may be noted that Durga is also known as Kaali and Chandi. Thousands of people, mainly from the Jammu region, visit the shrine every August. In 1981, the shrine was visited by Thakur Kulveer Singh of Bhaderwah, Jammu. In 1987, Thakur Kulveer Singh began an annual tradition called 'Chhadi Yatra'. Thousands of people visit the shrine every year during 'Chhadi Yatra'. Many pilgrims report supernatural occurrences while at the shrine. To reach the shrine, one may take a bus from Jammu, Udhampur, Ramnagar, or Bhaderwah or hire a cab. It takes approximately ten hours to travel from Jammu to the base camp Gulabgarh by road, after which a 32 km foot journey begins. It usually takes two days to reach the shrine on foot. There are many villages on the way where one can stay for the night. The chaddi takes three days to reach Machail. Many people organize roadside 'langars' (free food points) on the way to the Gulabgarh. The government of Jammu and Kashmir also arranges basic amenities for the pilgrims.  Another means for reaching the shrine is to take a helicopter from Jammu and Gulabgarh. The helipad is located 100 meters from the shrine.
 Awaans is a festival in which a huge fire is lit in front of a temple in Karthie. All the religious pujaris (priests) from nearby villages come wearing traditional dress and are welcomed by local villagers. The festival happens once every three years, attracting people from across Paddar. Participants enjoy group dances and singing. This festival is a symbol of the rich and diverse culture of Paddar, which embraces love and respect for people irrespective of caste or colour.Uzzan' is a festival of religious Sentiments.It is celebrated all over the valley it stats from remote village 'chitto' and ends in the village of 'Jar' 9 mens from chitto comes to 'tatapani'and stay at Sh.Balwan'' ji house main motive was to clean the kund situated in tatapani 
After cleaning the went to different houses for biksha,eat rangai and return back to chitto.

Transport

Air
The closest airports to Paddar are Jammu Airport and Srinagar International Airport, which are 280 and 270 km away, respectively. The nearest helipad is located in Gulabgarh.

Rail
There is no railway station in Paddar. The nearest railway station is the Udhampur railway station, which is 212 km away.

Road
Paddar Valley is connected to the rest of India by the Keylong-Tandi-Killar-Gulabgarh-Kishtwar road.

References

Kishtwar district
Jammu and Kashmir